Dodonaea is a genus of about 70 species of flowering plants, often known as hop-bushes, in the soapberry family, Sapindaceae. It has a cosmopolitan distribution in tropical, subtropical and warm temperate regions of Africa, the Americas, southern Asia and Australasia. By far the highest species diversity is in Australia. The genus is named after Rembert Dodoens, traditionally known as 'Dodonaeus'.

The leaves are alternate, simple or pinnate. The flowers are produced in short racemes. The fruit is a capsule, often with two or three wings.
Dodonaea species are used as food plants by the larvae of some Lepidoptera species including Aenetus eximia and Aenetus ligniveren.

Systematics
Dodonaea is one of the largest genera in the Sapindaceae, and includes 70 species widely distributed in continental Australia. The only other species of the Dodonaea widely spread beyond mainland Australia, Dodonaea viscosa, is believed to be one of the world's most greatly disseminated transoceanic plants.

The first attempts to distinguish infrageneric categories within genus Dodonaea were based on leaf morphology, specifically, two sections - Eu-Dodonaea (simple leaves) and Remberta (pinnate leaves) were differentiated. Later this sectional classification was expanded by Bentham, who included 39 species in five series - four simple-leaved series further divided on capsule-appendage morphology (series Cyclopterae, Platypterae, Cornutae and Apterae) and one pinnate-leaved species (series Pinnatae).

Later the genus has been reviewed extensively two times.  Radlkofer identified Dodonaea as a part of the tribe Dodonaeeae, within Dyssapindaceae, together with Loxodiscus, Diplopeltis and Distichostemon. Dodonaea and Distichostemon share similar morphological characteristics which include plants having regular flowers without petals and an intrastaminal disc. Therefore, these two genera are considered to be closely related.

54 Dodonaea species identified by Radlkofer were divided into three series (Cyclopterae, Platypterae and Aphanopterae) and six subseries.  As classifiers were taken the presence or absence of an aril and leaves’ glandular structures.

Another revision of the genus was proposed by West, where Dodonaea were divided into six species groups by using a combination of characters. Species with the most primitive characters were classified in Group 1 and Group 6 included plants with the most derived states. For instance, the character of an aril possession was recognized as a derived trait.

The most recent molecular study of phylogenetic relationships within the genus revealed some discrepancy with the previously stated hypotheses of morphological evolution within Dodonaea which classified taxa by the combination of leaf, capsule and seed characters. As in preceding morphological research, species with compound leaves were identified in several clades, interspersed among species with simple leaves (e.g. D. humilis is the only species in Clade I with imparipinnate leaves). The breeding system has great variation across the phylogeny, and although most species are dioecious, sometimes some species may differ from this state being monoecious. Most genera in Sapindaceae are dioecious, however, most closely related to Dodonaea in the phylogeny (Diplopeltis, Diplopeltis stuartii and Cossinia) are monoecious. It has also been reported that whereas normally breeding system in Harpullia is dioecism, a few species have also been recognized as monoecious. It was stated that during evolution a general breeding-system across the phylogeny was dioecism, however, the polygamous state was intermediate or, might be partially reversible.

Molecular data supports an evidence that monophyly of Dodonaea includes all species of Distichostemon. It is also supported by the morphological characters as synapomorphies of flowers with reduced petal number and with a highly reduced intrastaminal disk, the trait which is absent in staminate flowers. Both West and Radlkofer used an aril presence or absence as a character to define species groups. All the main clades of Dodonaea and also two species of Diplopeltis have small funicular arils. Seeds of D. viscosa have very small funicular aril, and are harvested by Pheidole sp. of ants and deposited in middens outside the nest after the elaiosome has been consumed.

Bayesian MCMC estimation of Dodonaea phylogeny supported the hypothesis that two species of Cossinia are sisters to Diplopeltis and Dodonaea. Nevertheless, Diplopeltis is identified as a paraphyletic group. The monophyly of Dodonaea is well supported by Bayesian MCMC estimation (1.00 posterior probability, PP). Within the Clade I (1.00 PP) eight species are recognized as sister to the remaining Dodonaea. Distichostemon is placed in the Clade II (1.00 PP). The phylogeny of remaining 53 species of Dodonaea (1.00 PP) is poorly supported (<0.95 PP).

Dodonaea viscosa is placed within the Clade IV being closely related to D.biloba, D.procumbens and D.camfieldii. It is known that D. viscosa and D. camfieldii evolved in Australia from their most recent common ancestor. D.viscosa is widely distributed in Australia today while D. camfieldii is restricted to New South Wales. The divergence of these taxa occurred approximately in the Late Pliocene to Early Pleistocene (2.7–1.4 Ma, 95% Highest Posterior Density, HPD). The molecular data shows evidence that a monophyletic D. viscosa includes two species, D. procumbens and D. biloba.

Clade I: D. triquetra SE, D. triangularis MT, D. lanceolata MTEr, D. serratifolia SE, D. trifida SW, D. bursariifolia SWSE, D. amblyophylla SW.

Clade II:   Distichostemon arnhemicus MT, Distichostemon malvaceus MT, Distichostemon hispidulus var aridus MT, Distichostemon hispidulus var hspidulus MT, Distichostemon dodocandrus MT, Distichostemon barklyanus MT, Distichostemon filamentosus MT.

Clade III a: D. humifusa SW, D. ceratocarpa SW, D. pinifolia SW, D. ericoides SWEr, D. D.ivaricata SW, D. caespitosa SW, D. tepperi SE, D. hexandra SE, D. stenophylla MT,D. pachyneura Er, D. rigidia Er, D. baueri SEEr.

Clade III b: D. platyptera MT, D. adenophora ErSW, D. microzyga Er, D. polyzyga MT, D. physocarpa MT, D. madagascariensis Os, D. stenozyga ErSWSE, D. polyandra MTOs, D. concinna SW, D. larreoides E.

Clade IV: D. vestita MT, D. procumbens SE, D. biloba SE, D. viscosa ErSWSEMTOs, D. camfieldii SE.

Clade V: D. rupicola SE, D. boroniifolia SEMT, D. pinnata SE, D. multijuga SE, D. filiformis SE, D. macrossanii SE, D. oxyptera M.

Clade VI:  D. falcata SE, D. peduncularis SEMT, D. filifolia MT, D. uncinata MT, D. hackettiana SW, D. coriacea Er, D. hirsuta SE.

Clade VII: D. truncatiales SE, D. rhombifolia SE, D. megazyga SE, D. tenuifolia SEMT, D. heteromorpha SE,  D. inaequifolia SWEr, D. ptarmicaefolia SW, D. lobulata ErSWSE, D. aptera SW, D. intricata SE, D. sinuolata ssp sinuolata SE.

Species
Dodonaea adenophora Miq.
Dodonaea amblyophylla Diels
Dodonaea aptera Miq. — coast hop-bush (Western Australia)
Dodonaea baueri Endl.
Dodonaea bilobaJ.G.West
Dodonaea boroniifolia G.Don
Dodonaea bursariifolia F.Muell.
Dodonaea caespitosa Diels
Dodonaea camfieldii Maiden & Betche
Dodonaea ceratocarpa Endl.
Dodonaea concinna Benth.
Dodonaea coriacea (Ewart & O.B.Davies) McGill.
Dodonaea divaricata Benth.
Dodonaea ericifolia G.Don
Dodonaea ericoides Miq.
Dodonaea falcataJ.G.West
Dodonaea filifoliaHook.
Dodonaea filiformis Link
Dodonaea glandulosaJ.G.West
Dodonaea hackettiana W.Fitzg.
Dodonaea heteromorphaJ.G.West
Dodonaea hexandra F.Muell.
Dodonaea hirsuta Maiden & Betche
Dodonaea hispidula Endl.
Dodonaea humifusa Miq.
Dodonaea humilis Endl.
Dodonaea inaequifolia Turcz.
Dodonaea intricataJ.G.West – Gawler Ranges hop bush
Dodonaea lanceolata F.Muell.
Dodonaea larreoides Turcz.
Dodonaea lobulata F.Muell. –  lobed-leaved hop-bush, lobed hop-bush, lobed leaf hop bush
Dodonaea macrossanii F.Muell. & Scort.
Dodonaea madagascariensis Radlk.
Dodonaea megazyga (F.Muell.) F.Muell. ex Benth.
Dodonaea microzyga F.Muell.
Dodonaea multijuga G.Don.
Dodonaea oxyptera F.Muell.
Dodonaea pachyneura F.Muell.
Dodonaea peduncularis Lindl.
Dodonaea petiolaris F.Muell.
Dodonaea physocarpa F.Muell.
Dodonaea pinifolia Miq.
Dodonaea pinnata Sm.
Dodonaea platyptera F.Muell.
Dodonaea polyandra Merr. & L.M.Perry
Dodonaea polyzyga F.Muell.
Dodonaea procumbens F.Muell.
Dodonaea ptarmicifolia Turcz.
Dodonaea rhombifolia N.A.Wakef.
Dodonaea rigida J.G.West
Dodonaea rupicola C.T.White
Dodonaea serratifolia McGill.
Dodonaea sinuolata J.G.West
Dodonaea spatulata Sm.
Dodonaea stenophylla F.Muell.
Dodonaea stenozyga F.Muell.
Dodonaea subglanduliferaJ.G.West
Dodonaea tenuifolia Lindl.
Dodonaea tepperi F.Muell. ex Tepper
Dodonaea triangularis Lindl.
Dodonaea trifida F.Muell.
Dodonaea triquetra J.C.Wendl.
Dodonaea truncatiales F.Muell.
Dodonaea uncinata J.G.West
Dodonaea vestita Hook.
Dodonaea viscosa Jacq. (Pantropical)
Dodonaea viscosa subsp. angustifolia (L.f.) J.G.West
Dodonaea viscosa subsp. angustissima (DC.) J.G.West
Dodonaea viscosa subsp. cuneata (Sm.) J.G.West
Dodonaea viscosa subsp. viscosa

Formerly placed here:
Combretum caffrum (Eckl. & Zeyh.) Kuntze (as D. caffra Eckl. & Zeyh.)

References

 
Sapindaceae genera
Taxa named by Philip Miller
Dioecious plants